Leirvatnet may refer to several lakes in Norway:

Leirvatnet (Eidfjord), a lake in Eidfjord municipality, Hordaland county
Leirvatnet (Lom), a lake in Lom municipality, Oppland county
Leirvatnet (Luster), a lake in Luster municipality, Sogn og Fjordane county
Leirvatnet (Narvik), a lake in Narvik municipality, Nordland county
Leirvatnet (Sørfold), a lake in Sørfold municipality, Nordland county